Grace G. Costavas Murphy (sometimes referred to as Grayce Costavas Murphy) was Michigan’s first African American female lawyer. She graduated from the Detroit College of Law in 1923. Upon being sworn in as an attorney in Wayne County the same year, Murphy became the first African American female admitted to practice law in Michigan. She died in 1932.

See also 

 List of first women lawyers and judges in Michigan

References 

Michigan lawyers
20th-century American women lawyers
20th-century American lawyers
Detroit College of Law alumni
1932 deaths